Great Schism may refer to:

 East–West Schism, between the  Orthodox Church and the Catholic Church, beginning in 1054
 Western Schism, a split within the Roman Catholic Church that lasted from 1378 to 1417

See also
 Schism, a division between people, usually belonging to an organization, movement, or religious denomination
 Shia–Sunni relations, their division traces back to a Sunni–Shia schism